Hope Bay is a settlement in Jamaica. It had a population of 1,646 as of 2009.

References

Populated places in Portland Parish